Jetclub is a charter airline based in Mexico City.

Fleet 
The Jetclub fleet consists of the following aircraft (as of 24 May 2008):
1 Airbus A320-211 (which is operated for Delta Air Lines)
1 Boeing 757-200 (which is operated by VIM Airlines)
The Boeing 757 was leased in 2008 May and only is suministred by VIM in the April–May season.

References

Charter airlines of Mexico
Airlines of Mexico City
Airlines established in 2002
Airlines of Mexico
Mexican companies established in 2002